Yevgeni Khrabrostin may refer to:

 Yevgeni Khrabrostin (footballer, born 1951), Soviet Russian football player
 Yevgeni Khrabrostin (footballer, born 1974), Russian football player